Thomas Brand Whitby (2 November 1813 – 7 December 1881) was an English cricketer active in the 1830s. He was born at Eynsford, Kent.

Whitby made two appearances in first-class cricket for Kent in 1837 against Sussex at Brighton, and Nottinghamshire at Town Malling. A batsman of unknown handedness, Whitby scored a total of 12 runs in his two matches, while with the ball he bowled seventeen wicket-less overs.

He died at Hackney, Middlesex on 7 December 1881.

References

External links

1813 births
1881 deaths
People from Eynsford
English cricketers
Kent cricketers